is a Shinto shrine in Kamakura and the site of the Hidden Village of Kamakura. It is located very near the Zeniarai Benzaiten Ugafuku Shrine.

History
Tradition holds that Sasuke Inari Shrine was created by Minamoto no Yoritomo. While in exile in Izu, Yoritomo was visited in a dream by an old man from the Hidden Village of Kamakura who instructed Yoritomo of the timing to begin battling his enemies. When Yoritomo succeeded and became shōgun, he created this shrine in gratitude. An alternative to this story has an Inari Fox messenger appearing in Yoritomo's dream.

According to Kamakura Historian Shimizu Ginzō, the hidden village that was adjacent to the shrine was the dwelling of a band of people that were the antecedents to the Ninja.  The remoteness and easy defensibility provided the necessary seclusion to conduct their activities which included elimination of enemies of the Kamakura shogunate.

In popular culture
The Sasuke Inari Shine is a key real world location used in the 2004 Anime Elfen Lied.

Notes

References
 Moriyama, T. (1998). "Weekend Adventures Outside of Tokyo", Shufunotomo Co. Ltd., Tokyo Japan, .
 Mutsu, I. (1995). "Kamakura Fact and Legend", Charles E. Tuttle Company, Inc., Rutland Vermont, 

Shinto shrines in Kanagawa Prefecture
Buildings and structures in Kamakura, Kanagawa
Inari shrines